Ali İsmet Öztürk (born 23 May 1964) is a Turkish professional display pilot, an aerobatic aircraft designer and an aviation businessman. He is the first civilian to be recognised as a professional aerobatic pilot in the country.
He flies in international air shows in his custom designed and manufactured world-class performance aerobatic aircraft called "" (Purple Violet).

Ali İsmet Öztürk has been admired worldwide both for his accomplishments in the air as an air show pilot, and on the ground for his technical talent to build aerobatics aircraft. He is best known by air show fans and enthusiasts for his extremely complex and technical manoeuvres. He was also the first professional civil pilot to perform an aerobatics display over the Bosphorus.

Between 2004 and 2008, Ali İsmet Öztürk performed in more than 80 international air shows, performing more than 559 displays in 19 different countries. He has performed before nearly 15 million spectators.

His enthusiasm for aviation has grown since he took his first solo flight. As an aviation enthusiast, he puts a strong emphasis on recognition and appreciation of aerobatics. To that end he strives to be a positive role model and inspiration to young people in aviation. With a career devoted to furthering aviation, he actively participates in activities to raise public awareness of private aviation in Turkey. He takes part in fundraising activities and arranges aerobatic experience flights to share the spirit of aviation with the community as well.

Ali İsmet Öztürk currently resides in Istanbul, Turkey with his two daughters and works full-time both domestically and abroad as a professional display pilot, an aircraft designer, an aerobatic flight instructor and provides consultancy in the aviation sector. His daughter Semin Öztürk Şener is Turkey's first female professional civilian aerobatic pilot. He is always ready for new adventures in the air shows worldwide and is always looking for invitations to share his experiences.

Early years and introduction to aviation 

Ali İsmet Öztürk was born in Istanbul, Turkey on 23 May 1964. During his childhood Ali İsmet Öztürk has shown great affection on aviation.

In 1983, he completed his education in Lycée Français Saint Benoît (Saint Benoit French High School of Istanbul) where he had been trained in French literature and studied English as well. Then he attended Istanbul University graduating with a Bachelor of Arts degree in Business Administration.

His aviation career began in 1984, when he was just 20 years old. That year he soloed for the first time an aircraft – an ultra-light. Since then he has had a long flying history with diverse aviation experiences.

Commercial aviation career 

Ali İsmet Öztürk acquired his pilot license for fixed-wing aircraft in 1985 and right after that in between 1987 and 1988 he took his passion further to CPL License (for helicopter & airplane). He obtained both IR (Instrument Rating) and ME (Multi-Engine) ratings for both airplanes and helicopters as well. He became a flight instructor subsequently, by getting his FI (Flight Instructor) License.

During these years, he led several projects on helicopter photography & video production and aerial live-broadcasting services on international basis. Thanks to his aggressive maneuvering skills he soon became pioneer in this field. His works has been used in several films and broadcast on both national and international news.

At the end of 1989, he established his own Aviation Company, Mach Air Ltd. Headquartered in Istanbul Atatürk International Airport, the company offered FBO (fixed-base operator) services such as aircraft repair and maintenance, air taxi operations and aerial photography & filming.

While carrying out managerial duties in his company, Ali İsmet Öztürk continued to train for more flying qualifications. He obtained the AMT (Aircraft System & Maintenance Technician) Certificate and became a test pilot for both helicopters & airplanes. Since then he has test flown more than 50 different types of aircraft.

Aerobatics career 

Ali İsmet Öztürk flew an aerobatic aircraft for the first time in a small side-by-side seated airplane with one of his friends in 1988. He was so impressed that his aviation interests expanded to include acrobatics and performing in air shows became an ambition for him. Besides commercial piloting, he started out practicing aerobatics as well and as he developed aerobatics skills and he eventually purchased his first aerobatic biplane in 1992.

In the early 2000s, after 16 years of remarkable aviation history and a well known entrepreneurial success in the international aviation arena, he finally decided to go after his dream and opened a new colorful chapter in his career. His ultimate goal was to be recognized worldwide in the field of air show aerobatics. To that end, from 2000 on he has just flown aerobatics and he committed all of his time and energy solely to aerobatics.

He has trained hard on daily basis to prepare himself for air show performances. He has increased his ability to experience G levels up to +9/-6g and became capable to perform extreme, gravity-defying acrobatic maneuvers with ease. Meanwhile, he successfully passed the exams of UK CAA (United Kingdom, Civil Aviation Authorities) in Unlimited Level and earned his DA (Display Authorization) Certificate which provided him the authorization to display legally in all international air show organizations.

Besides his disciplined, passionate and persistent efforts, his accumulated knowledge, skills and expertise derived from his past aviation experiences allowed him to be one of the most experienced aerobatic display pilots in a very short time span. When he started to perform in international air shows, thanks to his maturity and brilliance of style in the sky, he managed to amaze aviation circle soon and gained recognition and appreciation worldwide.

By 2003, in a quest for perfection to bring the highest performance in the sky over world's best air shows Öztürk has custom built the "Mor Menekşe" (Purple Violet), an awesome, single-seat aerobatic biplane of his own design. With its extensively modified airframe and engine (407 hp), Purple Violet is entirely in a class of its own.

In 2005, he performed during the Royal International Air Tattoo (RIAT) held in the United Kingdom and known as the world's largest military air show. Not only was he the first civilian Turkish pilot to join the show but he was awarded "the best aerobatic pilot" in the civilian category, as well.

In 2006, he displayed in "ILA Berlin Air Show" organized by the German Aerospace Industries Association (Bundesverband der Deutschen Luft – und Raumfahrtindustrie e.V. – BDLI) and he became the first Turkish pilot to be invited to this "world’s oldest aerospace trade show".

In 2007, he was honored by EAC (European Airshow Council) as the best professional airshow pilot to promote sponsors with best value.

In 2011, he performed in the International Festival of Aviation held in Izmir/Turkey, combining the "Air Show Türkiye 2011" (the leading event of the Centennial celebrations of the Turkish Air Force (TuAF)) with the European Air Chiefs (EurAC) and the Global Air Chiefs Conferences. During the organisation he soloed among the most accomplished aerobatic teams of the world, as the only civilian professional aerobatic pilot from Turkey.

Air show performances 

Ali İsmet Öztürk is best known by air show fans and enthusiasts for his action-packed displays which involve extreme positive and negative G maneuvers. His routines include many high energy gyroscopic maneuvers.

Today, Ali İsmet Öztürk elevates himself to the highest level of his potential simply by practicing continuously and creating new opportunities to learn from. He always pushes the boundaries by exploring the limits of both himself and his custom built biplane, "Purple Violet" while remaining well within his high margin of safety. He injects new maneuvers in his performance and re-arranges his routine in a continuous manner so that he can offer impressive displays to crowds each season.

References

External links
 Ali İsmet Öztürks' Biography, UzmanTV, retrieved 2013-01-26
 "Air Show Türkiye, İzmir-Çiğli Report", UK Airshow Review, Published on 2011-06-05. Retrieved 2013-01-24
 "Ali İsmet Öztürk Şov Turunda", AirportHaber Online Magazine, Published on 2008-05-18. Retrieved 2013-01-24
 "Berlin Airshow'a özel davetli Türk pilot", Transport Magazine, Issue No. 26, Published in June 2006. Retrieved 2012-01-24
 "İstanbul Boğazı’nda gösteri uçuşu", NTVMSNBC Online News, Published on 2001-05-23. Retrieved 2013-01-24
 "'Hava'lı düello!", Akşam, Published on 2009-11-05. Retrieved 2013-02-03
 Habertürk TV / Airport: Airshow Side 2011, retrieved 2013-02-08
 "Ali İsmet Öztürk: Avrupa'da bir Türk pilotu", CNN Türk TV Channel, Kokpit, retrieved 2012-02-08
 Çamcı, Bülent, "Haliç semalarında gökyüzü F1'i", Akşam, Published on 2006-07-30
 Bezzicheri, Aldo, "La Comina. L’airshow che non ti aspetti!", VFRMagazine, Published on 2010-07-18, retrieved 2013-02-09

See also 
 EURAC – European Air Chiefs' Conference Official Web Page, retrieved 2013-02-08
 "I partecipanti ai 100 anni a La Comina" (in Italian). Airplanes – The Italian Aviation Magazine (Pordenone, Italy), Issue: 5. Published on 2010-06-26/27.
 Michiels, Renaud (11 September 2007). "Cet avion n'est pas fait pour voler" (in French). Le Matin – People, Portrait (Lausanne, Switzerland: Tamedia Publications romandes SA). Page No. 28. "Alı Öztürk 43 ans, marie', deux enfants, Ali vit à Istanbul. Avec son biplan, ce voltigour Turc est l'une des grandes stars des meetings aériens européens."

Aerobatic pilots
1964 births
Businesspeople from Istanbul
Istanbul University alumni
Turkish aviators
Living people